Arhopala ariana is a species of butterfly belonging to the lycaenid family. It was described by William Harry Evans in 1925. It is found in Southeast Asia (Langkawi, Mergui, Burma, and Thailand).

Subspecies
Arhopala ariana ariana (Langkawi, Mergui, southern Burma, Thailand)
Arhopala ariana wilcocksi Eliot, 1973 (Langkawi)

References

Arhopala
Butterflies described in 1925
Butterflies of Asia
Taxa named by William Harry Evans